The 1894 college football season was the season of American football played among colleges and universities in the United States during the 1894–95 academic year. 

The 1894 Yale Bulldogs football team compiled a perfect 16–0 record, outscored opponents by a total of 485 to 13, and has been recognized as the national champion by the Billingsley Report, Helms Athletic Foundation, and National Championship Foundation, and as co-champion by Parke H. Davis. 

Penn also compiled a perfect record (12–0) and was recognized as the co-national champion by Parke H. Davis. Despite suffering losses to both Yale and Penn, Princeton was recognized as the national champion under the Houlgate System.

All eleven players selected by Caspar Whitney and Walter Camp to the 1894 All-America college football team came from the Big Three (Princeton, Yale, and Harvard) or Penn. Six of the honorees have been inducted into the College Football Hall of Fame: halfback George Brooke, end Frank Hinkey (Yale), end Charlie Gelbert, tackle Langdon Lea (Princeton), guard Art Wheeler (Princeton), and guard Bill Hickok (Yale).

New programs established in 1893 included Arkansas, Oregon, and Texas A&M.

On November 29, college football was first played in the state of Florida by Stetson University.

Conference and program changes

Conference changes
Three conferences began play in 1894:
Maryland Intercollegiate Football Association – active until 1899
Michigan Intercollegiate Athletic Association – now a Division III conference
Southern Intercollegiate Athletic Association – active until 1942
Two conferences played their final seasons in 1894:
Indiana Intercollegiate Athletic Association – founded in 1890
Middle States Intercollegiate Football League – founded in 1893

Membership changes

Conference standings

Major conference standings

Independents

Minor conferences

Minor independents

See also
 1894 College Football All-America Team

References